Peter Kinderman (born 1965) is professor of Clinical Psychology at the University of Liverpool, and is a Chartered Clinical Psychologist.

Early life and education
Kinderman was born in Sussex, and attended King's College, Cambridge as an undergraduate. He then worked at St James’ Hospital Leeds, before professional training in Clinical Psychology at the University of Leeds.

Career
He then worked in the National Health Service as a Clinical Psychologist before taking a job as a junior lecturer at the University of Liverpool, where he registered for a Ph.D. supervised by Richard Bentall. Soon after being awarded his doctorate, he moved to the University of Manchester, and then later returned to the University of Liverpool, where he became professor of Clinical Psychology.

Research interests, publications and courses
His research interests are in psychological processes underpinning well-being and mental health, and in particular psychotic phenomena such as delusions and hallucinations.

In 2014 he launched a free, online, open-access course exploring our understanding of mental health and well-being.

Kinderman has published widely on the role of psychological factors as mediators between biological, social and circumstantial factors in mental health and well-being. In his 2019 book, A Manifesto for Mental Health: Why We Need a Revolution in Mental Health Care, he critically examines the dominant ‘disease-model’ of mental health care and offers a contemporary, biopsychosocial, alternative.

In 2022 Kinderman had a 2021 paper he co-authored in the Journal of Mental Health retracted by the journal's editors and publisher for a "conflict of interest [that] was not disclosed upon submission of the article [...] that compromises the reliability of the reviews and the paper’s findings." In response, Kinderman wrote that "the retraction is justified."

Roles and awards
In 2000, he received the British Psychological Society's Division of Clinical Psychology's 'May Davidson Award', an annual award for outstanding contributions to the field of clinical psychology, in the first ten years after qualifying.

He served the British Psychological Society as President (2016-2017) and twice as elected Chair of the Society's Division of Clinical Psychology; from 2004 to 2005, and again from 2010–2011. In that role, he worked with the UK Department of Health, the BBC, the  Health Professions Council,  the European Union Fundamental Rights Agency and the UK Office for National Statistics, amongst others. In 2017, he resigned from being Vice-President of the British Psychological Society, citing the formation of the Association of Clinical Psychologists (UK) as a trigger,

Kinderman is a member of the Council for Evidence Based Psychiatry, and a trustee of the Joanna Simpson Foundation,.

References

1965 births
Living people
British psychologists